Paul "Pen" Farthing (born May 1969) is a British former Royal Marines commando and founder of the Nowzad Dogs charity.

Personal life

Paul Farthing was born in Essex, England. He became a sergeant in the Royal Marines.

Founding of the Nowzad charity 
Farthing is the founder of Nowzad Dogs charity and author of a number of books, including Wylie: The Brave Street Dog Who Never Gave Up. In 2006, Farthing was deployed to Afghanistan where he broke up a street dog fight in the town of Nawzad. One of the dogs, later named Nowzad, followed him during his deployment. Farthing sought to bring the dog home to the UK at the end of his deployment, inspiring him to create the animal charity Nowzad Dogs.

Evacuation of animals from Afghanistan (2021) 
In August 2021, during the fall of Kabul, Farthing decided to stay in the city until his Afghan staff members, along with their family members (a total of 71 people) were granted permission to leave. Well wishers raised more than £200,000 to charter a flight to evacuate Nowzad's staff, their family members and animals in the charity's shelter.
	
During the Fall of Kabul, Farthing accused the British Ministry of Defence of blocking the evacuation flight from landing at Hamid Karzai International Airport. The Defence Secretary Ben Wallace rejected these claims, stating his department could not get his staff as well as pets through the Taliban checkpoints and the crowd around the airport, and the plane would have had to wait for hours. He added that he was not going to "prioritise pets over people". 
		
The Government of the United Kingdom granted visas for 68 of the 71 staff and their family members on 23 August, but did not give permission for the evacuation of the charity's animals. Permission was finally granted on 25 August.

On 27 August, the British Armed Forces assisted Farthing and his animals in getting to the airport. He left Afghanistan with them on 28 August as the only passenger on a private jet with 229 seats. The charity's Afghan staff were turned away at an airport checkpoint by the Taliban, who said they did not have the required visa stamps.

Controversy
During the UK's evacuation from Afghanistan, Farthing became the target of a number of newspaper briefings against him by members of the ruling Conservative party and their allies. UK Defence Secretary Ben Wallace accused Farthing of interfering with efforts to evacuate British nationals and Afghan allies from Kabul, and said he and his supporters were using intimidation tactics and misrepresenting events. The Sunday Times obtained a recording of a threatening voicemail Farthing sent to Peter Quentin, a special adviser to Ben Wallace, accusing him of blocking his flight, while also warning he would "destroy" Quentin if he did not approve the flight and immediately grant travel documents to Farthing's staff and their family members.

Wildlife campaigner Dominic Dyer accused the government of running a "smear campaign" and using him as a scapegoat by leaking the voicemail to hide its own failings in not evacuating more people using the private jet that flew Farthing along with his animals out of Afghanistan. Farthing later apologised for the voicemail, stating that he made it out of frustration.

In December 2021, a Foreign Office whistleblower alleged that Prime Minister Boris Johnson had authorised the evacuation of the animals and Nowzad staff. Johnson however denied the allegation. Two emails sent by Foreign Office officials released by the Foreign Affairs Select Committee in January 2022 however stated that he had been involved in the evacuation, prompting accusations by critics, including the Labour Party, that Johnson had lied. The government however rejected the claims.

2023 evacuation
Farthing was evacuated again from Kabul on 6 January 2023 after Prince Harry, Duke of Sussex, claimed in his memoir Spare that he had killed 25 members of Taliban while serving in Afghanistan. The move was done to avoid "potential reprisal attacks on ex-forces people."

Awards
 Nominated for the RSPCA Animal Hero Awards (2013). 
 Awarded "CNN Hero of 2014" by CNN.

Bibliography 
 One Dog at a Time: Saving the Strays of Helmand – an Inspiring True Story. St Martin's, 2009. .
 No Place Like Home: a New Beginning with the Dogs of Afghanistan. Ebury, 2010. .
 Wylie: The Brave Street Dog Who Never Gave Up. Hodder & Stoughton, 2014. .

References

External links 
 Nowzad official website

Military personnel from Tiverton, Devon
21st-century Royal Marines personnel
Living people
Founders of charities
Royal Navy personnel of the War in Afghanistan (2001–2021)
Royal Marines ranks
1969 births